Maria Teschler-Nicola (born Eggenburg, 24 October 1950) is an Austrian human biologist, anthropologist and ethnologist. The Pallister–Killian syndrome is also called Teschler-Nicola syndrome after her.

Biography 
Teschler-Nicola took her Matura exams in 1970, and studied human biology, medicine and folkloristics at the University of Vienna from 1971 to 1976, and graduated with a Ph.D. degree in human biology. From 1970 to 1972 she worked as a research fellow in the Institute for Forensic Medicine at the University of Vienna, and afterwards until 1976 as contractual assistant professor at the Institute of Human Biology of the University of Vienna. In 1993 she got the Venia Legendi for human biology. In 1997 she acted as interim department director, and since 1998 she has been director of the Department of Archaeological Biology and Anthropology of the Museum of Natural History of Vienna. In 2000, she was appointed as extraordinary university professor by the Austrian president Thomas Klestil.

Awards 

 "Silbernes Ehrenzeichen für Verdienste um das Land Wien" (Silver Order of Merit for Service to the federal state Vienna)
 In 2014 she became a member of the German Academy of Sciences Leopoldina.

External links 

 Publications of Maria Teschler-Nicola
 Andre Trombeta: Maria Teschler-Nicola, whonamedit.com

References 

Austrian anthropologists
20th-century anthropologists
21st-century anthropologists
Austrian women anthropologists
Women ethnologists
Austrian ethnologists
Academic staff of the University of Vienna
University of Vienna alumni
Austrian curators
People from Eggenburg
1950 births
Living people
Members of the German Academy of Sciences Leopoldina